Vapor is a Canadian comedy-drama short film, directed by Kaveh Nabatian and released in 2010. The film depicts the emotional journey of Enrique Salgado (Marco Ledezma), a middle-aged gay Mexican man, through shame, fear and internalized homophobia toward self-acceptance, after being invited to pose in the nude for a photographer (Evergon).

The film was named to the Toronto International Film Festival's year-end Canada's Top Ten list for 2010. It received a Genie Award nomination for Best Live Action Short Drama at the 31st Genie Awards, and a Prix Jutra nomination for Best Short Film at the 13th Jutra Awards.

References

External links
 

2010 films
2010 LGBT-related films
Canadian LGBT-related short films
Quebec films
2010 short films
Spanish-language Canadian films
Canadian drama short films
2010s Canadian films